Togniniaceae is family of fungi in the order Togniniales.

Genera
As accepted by Wijayawardene et al. 2020;
 Phaeoacremonium  - 65 sp.

Note; Species Fungorum lists 68 species of Phaeoacremonium.

Formerly listed Conidiotheca tympanoides  now placed in the Xylariales order.

External links

References 

Fungal plant pathogens and diseases
Diaporthales